is a city located in Nagano Prefecture, Japan. , the city had an estimated population of 67,240 in 27,602 households, and a population density of 230 persons per km².

Geography
Shiojiri is located in central Nagano Prefecture, in the southern end of the Matsumoto Basin.

Surrounding municipalities
Nagano Prefecture
 Matsumoto
 Okaya
 Ina
 Tatsuno
 Minamiminowa
 Kiso Town
 Kiso Village
 Asahi

Climate
The city has a climate characterized by hot and humid summers, and relatively mild winters (Köppen climate classification Cfa).  The average annual temperature in Shiojiri is 11.4 °C. The average annual rainfall is 1161 mm with September as the wettest month. The temperatures are highest on average in August, at around 24.6 °C, and lowest in January, at around -1.1 °C.

History
Shiojiri is located in former Shinano Province, and as its name implies, was traditionally a centre for salt production. During the Edo period, Narai-juku, Shiojiri-shuku and Seba-juku developed as post stations on the Nakasendō highway connecting Edo with Kyoto. The village of Shiojiri was established with the creation of the modern municipalities system on April 1, 1889. It was elevated to town status on April 1, 1927. Shiojiri annexed the villages of Kataoka, Hirooka, Souga and Chikumazi on April 1, 1959 and was elevated to city status. Shiojiri lost Kitauchida hamlet and Gakenoyu hamlet (both in Kataoka ward) in 1960 and 1961 to Matsumoto city due to border adjustments. On June 28, 1961, Shiojiri absorbed the village of Seba and the village of Narakawa on April 1, 2005.

Demographics
Per Japanese census data, the population of Shiojiri has recently plateaued after several decades of growth.

Government
Shiojiri has a mayor-council form of government with a directly elected mayor and a unicameral city legislature of 18 members.
Toshiyuki Oguchi is serving as the current mayor of Shiojiri. His first win in the mayor election was in 2002.

Economy
The economy of Shiojiri is largely agricultural, with grapes, apples, pears, and wine production as major components. The manufacturing sector includes precision instrumentation.

Education
Shiojiri has nine public elementary schools and five public middle schools operated by the city government, and one public elementary school and one public middle school shared with neighbouring Tatsuno. The city also has two public high schools operated by the Nagano Prefectural Board of Education, and one private high school. The Matsumoto Dental University is also located in Shiojiri.

Transportation

Railway
 East Japan Railway Company - Chūō Main Line
  - 
 East Japan Railway Company - Shinonoi Line
  - 
 JR Tōkai - Chūō Main Line
  -  -  -  -

Highway
 Nagano Expressway

Sister cities

Within Japan
 Itoigawa, Niigata
 Minamiizu, Shizuoka

Overseas
  - Mishawaka, Indiana, United States

Local attractions
Shiojiri is the location of the Hiraide ruins, one of the three largest ancient ruins in Japan. Artifacts from the Jōmon period through the Heian period have been discovered there, as well as the remains of 47 ancient dwellings.

References

External links

Official Website 

 
Cities in Nagano Prefecture